Weisfeld is a surname. Notable people with the surname include: 

Gerald Weisfeld (1940–2020), British businessman, founder of What Every Woman Wants
Horatio Weisfeld, American writer, magazine editor, and publisher
Irwin Weisfeld (1932–1968), American writer and bookseller

See also
Weinfeld